The 2018 West Coast Conference baseball tournament will be held from May 24 through 26, 2018 at Banner Island Ballpark in Stockton, California.  The four team, double-elimination tournament winner will earn the league's automatic bid to the 2018 NCAA Division I baseball tournament.

Seeding
The top four finishers from the regular season will be seeded one through four based on conference winning percentage.  The teams will then play a double elimination tournament.

Results

References

West Coast Conference Baseball Championship
Tournament
West Coast Conference baseball tournament
Baseball competitions in Stockton, California
College baseball tournaments in California